"Paul and Silas in Jail" is a gospel blues song written by Washington Phillips (18801954), and recorded by him (vocals and zither) in 1927.

Description 
The song is in strophic form, and consists of five quatrains in rhyming couplets. According to the Acts of the Apostles, St. Paul and Silas were in Philippi (a former city in present-day Greece), where they were arrested, flogged, and imprisoned for causing a public nuisance. The song relates what happened next, as recorded in Acts 16:25-31:

Recordings 

 1927Washington Phillips, Columbia Records single

Other songs 
 "Paul and Silas (Bound in Jail)", an unrelated gospel song about the same Biblical story; it has sometimes been called "Paul and Silas in Jail"

References 

Blues songs
Gospel songs
Washington Phillips songs
1927 songs
Columbia Records singles
Songs about prison